Polly Findlay is a British theatre director, who won the Olivier for Best Entertainment in 2011 for Derren Brown's Svengali. She has directed seven productions for the National Theatre, and four for the Royal Shakespeare Company, where she is an associate artist.

Early life 
Findlay grew up in Wandsworth, her mother working in charity and her father as a legal journalist. Findlay was, herself, a successful child actor, starting with a small part in an RSC play at the age of 12 and undertaking a professional job a year until she went to University.

Education and Training 
Findlay studied English at Exeter College, University of Oxford, from 2001 to 2004, then completed post-graduate training in directing at LAMDA. In 2006, she trained on the Directors' Course at the National Theatre Studio. Findlay was the recipient of the Bulldog Princeps Bursary Award from 2006 to 2007, and in 2007, she won the James Menzies-Kitchin Trust's Young Theatre Director award with which she directed Romeo and Juliet at Battersea Arts Centre in July, 2007. She has since worked in major venues across the UK and in Europe.

Career 
In the years following her training, Findlay directed productions at the Arcola Theatre, Bush Theatre, Sadler's Wells, and the Lyric Hammersmith. Critically acclaimed productions include Sophocles' Antigone on the Olivier Stage at the National Theatre in 2011, Shakespeare's The Merchant of Venice for the Royal Shakespeare Company in 2015. Findlay's production of David Eldridge's new play Beginning opened at the National Theatre in October 2017 and transferred to the Ambassadors Theatre in the West End in January 2018. In 2018, she directed an adaptation of The Prime of Miss Jean Brodie at the Donmar, and in 2019, a production of Rutherford and Son at the National Theatre. In 2020, Findlay directed Caryl Churchill's A Number at the Bridge Theatre, and one of the first live theatre productions after the pandemic, Michael Frayn's Copenhagen at the Theatre Royal Bath.

In 2021, she directed Suzan-Lori Parks's play White Noise .

Outside of the UK, Findlay has directed in Germany and Denmark, including War Horse (Gefährten) at the Theater des Westens in Berlin, Strindberg's Frøken Julie at Aarhus Theatre.

Her next major theatre project will be a one-man show with Grayson Perry, opening at the beginning of 2021. She is currently writing a feature for BBC Films.

In 2022 she directed Middle by David Eldridge at the National Theatre.

References

Living people
British theatre directors
Year of birth missing (living people)